is a Japanese voice actress who is affiliated with Intention. She began her voice acting activities in 2017, and in 2020 she played her first main role as Natsumi Hodaka in the anime television series Diary of Our Days at the Breakwater. She is also known for her role as Asami Yūki in Higehiro.

Career
Kawaida was born in Aichi Prefecture on February 18, 1996. In 2009, she participated in a production of the musical Annie sponsored by Marumiya Corporation. In 2014, she participated in a voice acting audition sponsored by the International Voice Actor Development Association, where she received an Excellence Award. After attending a workshop held by the voice acting agency Intention, she made her voice acting debut in the anime television series Kirakira Pretty Cure a la Mode in 2017, and later became affiliated with Intention. In 2020, she voiced Natsumi Hodaka in the anime television series Diary of Our Days at the Breakwater, also performing the series' opening and ending themes together with her fellow cast members. In 2021, she voiced Asami Yūki in Higehiro. In 2022, she will voice Rufuria in RPG Real Estate, and Dokudami in In the Heart of Kunoichi Tsubaki.

Filmography

Anime

2017
Kirakira Pretty Cure a la Mode, Female student (episode 12)
Infini-T Force, Girl (episode 12)

2018
Hug! Pretty Cure, Mogumogu
Persona 5: The Animation, Female announcer (episode 12)
Cells at Work!, Immature thymus cell 4 (episode 9)

2019
The Magnificent Kotobuki, Cindi
Wasteful Days of High School Girls, Uzumaki (episodes 1, 5)
Ahiru no Sora, Sachi Fukanoshi
Granblue Fantasy the Animation, Maid (episode 3)

2020
The Case Files of Jeweler Richard, Boy (episode 1)
If My Favorite Pop Idol Made It to the Budokan, I Would Die, Stylish girl (episode 2)
Asteroid in Love, JAXA guide (episode 4), Student (episode 7)
Diary of Our Days at the Breakwater, Natsumi Hodaka
Gleipnir, Female student
Love Live! Nijigasaki High School Idol Club, Asaki

2021
Fena: Pirate Princess, Yukimaru Sanada (young)
Jujutsu Kaisen, Noritoshi Kamo (young)
Hori-san to Miyamura-kun, Schoolgirl (episode 6)
Laid-Back Camp, Hiroto Ichinomiya (episode 8)
Higehiro, Asami Yūki
Mars Red, You (episodes 8-11)

2022
RPG Real Estate, Rufuria
In the Heart of Kunoichi Tsubaki, Dokudami
JoJo's Bizarre Adventure: Stone Ocean, The Seven Young Goats

Dubbing

Live-action
All of Us Are Dead, Park Hee-su (Lee Chae-eun)
Peter Rabbit 2: The Runaway, Sara Nakamoto (Chika Yasumura)
Shazam! (2021 THE CINEMA edition), Eugene Choi (Ian Chen), Billy (David Kohlsmith)
Space Jam: A New Legacy, Xosha James (Harper Leigh Alexander)
West Side Story, Meche (Jamila Velazquez)

Animation
The Boss Baby: Family Business, 'No' Girl

References

External links
Official agency profile 

1996 births
Living people
Japanese video game actresses
Japanese voice actresses
Voice actresses from Aichi Prefecture
21st-century Japanese actresses